NGC 6342 is a globular cluster located in the constellation Ophiuchus. Its Shapley–Sawyer Concentration Class is IV, and it was discovered by the German-born British astronomer William Herschel on 28 May 1786. It is at a distance of 28,000 light years away from Earth.

NGC 6342 is classified as metal-rich, yet has only one generation of stars.

See also 
 List of NGC objects (6001–7000)
 List of NGC objects
 NGC 6366
 Messier 71

References

External links 
 

Globular clusters
6342
Ophiuchus (constellation)